The 1979 Walker Cup, the 27th Walker Cup golf match, was played on 30 and 31 May 1979, at Muirfield, Gullane, East Lothian, Scotland. The event was won by the United States 15½ to 8½.

The United States had an 8½  to 7½ lead after the second day foursomes. In the final round of 8 singles, Great Britain and Ireland had just one win, by Allan Brodie, while the United States won the other 7 matches for a convincing win.

Format
The format for play on Wednesday and Thursday was the same. There were four matches of foursomes in the morning and eight singles matches in the afternoon. In all, 24 matches were played.

Each of the 24 matches was worth one point in the larger team competition. If a match was all square after the 18th hole extra holes were not played. Rather, each side earned ½ a point toward their team total. The team that accumulated at least 12½ points won the competition. If the two teams were tied, the previous winner would retain the trophy.

Teams
Ten players for the United States and Great Britain & Ireland participated in the event plus one non-playing captain for each team.

Great Britain & Ireland
 & 
Captain:  Rodney Foster
 Gordon Brand Jnr
 Allan Brodie
 Jimmy Buckley
 Iain Carslaw
 John Davies
 Geoffrey Godwin
 Ian Hutcheon
 Michael Kelley
 Brian Marchbank
 Peter McEvoy

United States

Captain: Dick Siderowf
Doug Clarke
Doug Fischesser
Mike Gove
Scott Hoch
Jim Holtgrieve
Griff Moody
Mike Peck
Jay Sigel
Hal Sutton
Marty West

Wednesday's matches

Morning foursomes

Afternoon singles

Thursday's matches

Morning foursomes

Afternoon singles

References

Walker Cup
Golf tournaments in Scotland
Walker Cup
Walker Cup
Walker Cup